Artem Hennadiyovych Chelyadin (born 29 December 1999) is a Ukrainian professional footballer who plays as a midfielder for Ukrainian Premier League club Vorskla Poltava.

Career
Chelyadin is a product of Youth Sportive School from his native Zviahel in Zhytomyr Oblast and Skala Stryi Sportive System. In January 2017 he was promoted to the Skala main squad to compete in the Ukrainian First League. He made his debut for Skala Stryi in a game against Cherkaskyi Dnipro on 18 March 2017 in the Ukrainian First League.

References

External links
 
 

1999 births
Living people
Ukrainian footballers
FC Skala Stryi (2004) players
FC Vorskla Poltava players
Ukrainian Premier League players
Ukrainian First League players
People from Zviahel
Association football midfielders
Sportspeople from Zhytomyr Oblast